Höf-Präbach is a former municipality in the district of Graz-Umgebung in Styria, Austria. Since the 2015 Styria municipal structural reform, it is part of the municipality Eggersdorf bei Graz.

References

Cities and towns in Graz-Umgebung District